The 2001–02 Danish Superliga season was the 12th season of the Danish Superliga league championship, governed by the Danish Football Association. It took place from the first match on July 21, 2001, to final match on May 16, 2002.

The Danish champions qualified for the second UEFA Champions League 2002–03 qualification round, while the second and third placed teams qualified for the first qualification round of the UEFA Cup 2002–03. The fourth placed team qualified for the UEFA Intertoto Cup 2002, while the two lowest placed teams of the tournament was directly relegated to the Danish 1st Division. Likewise, the Danish 1st Division champions and runners-up were promoted to the Superliga.

Table

Results

Top goalscorers

See also
 2001-02 in Danish football

External links
  Fixtures at NetSuperligaen.dk
  Onside.dk by Viasat
  Peders Fodboldstatistik

Danish Superliga seasons
1
Denmark